A Taco Day is a celebratory day that promotes consumption of tacos.  In the United States National Taco Day is celebrated on May 3rd.  In Mexico Día del Taco (Day of the Taco) is celebrated on March 31.

In the United States 
May 3 - On April 30, 1968, Congress Member Henry B. González gave a speech on the floor of Congress in which he quoted the National Taco Week Council of San Antonio, Texas, as saying: "On May 3rd of every year National Taco Day will be observed in honor of the birth date of the great Texan and American, the Honorable Henry B. Gonzalez, Congressman of Bexar County and San Antonio." There is no indication that Congress took any further action.

In Mexico 
March 31 - Day of the Taco - Día del Taco - International Taco Day - Día Internacional del Taco created in 2007 by Televisa

In France 
In France, "Tacos Day" is July 31, however French tacos are very different from their Mexican counterpart. French tacos reportedly originated in the suburbs of Lyon.

Other 
October 4th is celebrated under the misnomer "National Taco Day." This has led to some confusion as this does not reference any country or correspond to any country's National Taco Day. This holiday was created as part of a 2009 advertisement campaign by the taco chain Del Taco.

See also 
 List of food days
 Taco Tuesday

References

External links 
 http://www.nationaltacoday.com/ - marketing site

Observances in the United States
Observances in Mexico
Spring (season) events in Mexico
Taco